The outrigger canoeing, mostly referred to as Va'a in the Pacific region, competition at the 2022 Pacific Mini Games will be held from 20–24 June 2022 at the 13th Fishermen Memorial Monument Beach in Saipan, Northern Mariana Islands.

Competition schedule

Participating nations
As of 1 June 2022, eleven countries and territories have confirmed their participation in va'a (outrigger canoeing) for the games.

Medal summary

References

Outrigger canoeing at the Pacific Games
2022 in canoeing
2022 Pacific Mini Games